Paulo Dos Santos (born 13 November 1973 in São Vicente, Cape Verde) is a Cape Verdean soccer midfielder who played two seasons with the New England Revolution in Major League Soccer, four seasons in the USISL and six seasons in Norway.

Youth
Dos Santos, a native of the Cape Verde Islands, moved to Brockton, Massachusetts when he was fourteen.  He attended the University of Rhode Island, playing on the men's soccer team from 1993 to 1995.  He finished his three seasons with the Rams with twenty-two goals and seventeen assists in thirty-nine games.  He graduated in 1997.

Professional
On 4 March 1996, the New England Revolution selected Dos Santos in the 3rd round (26th overall) of the 1996 MLS College Draft. He spent the season with the Revs, but never entered a game and was waived on 7 November 1996.  In February 1997, the Tampa Bay Mutiny selected Dos Santos in the 2nd round (18th overall) of the 1997 MLS Supplemental Draft. The Mutiny waived him before the season and on 15 April 1997, the Connecticut Wolves of the USISL signed Dos Santos. The team released him on 13 February 1998. He then moved to the Rhode Island Stingrays where he was a USISL D-3 All Star. In the winter of 1998–1999, he briefly played for an unknown team in the Cape Verde before returning to work in real estate in Rhode Island. On 12 March 1999, he was brought back into the New England Revolution by Steve Nichols. Nichols used him in sixteen games and he also played part of the season on loan with the Boston Bulldogs.  On 14 March 2000, the Revolution waived Dos Santos and in April 2000 he signed with the Boston Bulldogs. In 2002, he moved to Aalesunds FK in the Norwegian First Division.  In 2003, the team moved up to the Tippeligaen but was back in the First Division in 2004 and was promoted back to the Tippeligaen in 2005.  Dos Santos remained with the team through those moves. He moved to FK Haugesund for the 2006 season.  In the summer of 2007, he moved to Hødd as a free agent. The team released him after the season and he moved to Cape Verde.

References

External links
Sams-Army.com Player Profile
New England Revolution history

Aalesunds FK players
Boston Bulldogs (soccer) players
Cape Verdean footballers
Cape Verdean expatriate sportspeople in the United States
Connecticut Wolves players
Expatriate soccer players in the United States
Expatriate footballers in Norway
Eliteserien players
FK Haugesund players
IL Hødd players
New England Revolution players
Seacoast United Phantoms players
Rhode Island Stingrays players
Major League Soccer players
Sportspeople from Brockton, Massachusetts
1973 births
Living people
Cape Verdean emigrants to the United States
People from São Vicente, Cape Verde
Rhode Island Rams men's soccer players
USL Second Division players
A-League (1995–2004) players
New England Revolution draft picks
Tampa Bay Mutiny draft picks
Cape Verdean expatriate footballers
Association football midfielders
Cape Verdean expatriate sportspeople in Norway
Soccer players from Massachusetts